The 2003 Champions Tour was the 24th season for the golf tour now known as PGA Tour Champions. The tour, officially founded in 1980 as the Senior PGA Tour, adopted the "Champions Tour" name starting with this season, and used that name through its 2015 season.

The 2003 season consisted of 31 official money events with purses totaling $53,600,000. For the first time, the Senior British Open was recognized as a Champions Tour major, bringing the list of senior majors to its current total of five. Craig Stadler won the most tournaments, three. The tournament results, leaders, and award winners are listed below.

Tournament results
The following table shows all the official money events for the 2003 season. "Date" is the ending date of the tournament. The numbers in parentheses after the winners' names are the number of wins they had on the tour up to and including that event. Senior majors are shown in bold.

Source:

Leaders
Scoring Average leaders

Source:

Money List leaders

Source:

Career Money List leaders

Source:

Awards

See also
Champions Tour awards
Champions Tour records

References

External links
PGA Tour Champions official site

PGA Tour Champions seasons
Champions Tour